Hokuriku may refer to:

 Hokuriku (train), a sleeping car train in Japan
 Hokuriku Shinkansen, a high-speed railway line connecting Tokyo with Kanazawa
 The Hokuriku region in Japan
 ALO's Hokuriku, a Japanese football club based in Toyama, Japan